The 1955 Iowa Hawkeyes football team represented the University of Iowa in the 1955 Big Ten Conference football season.

Schedule

Roster

Postseason awards
Cal Jones - Outland Trophy, Consensus First-team All-American

1956 NFL Draft

References

Iowa
Iowa Hawkeyes football seasons
Iowa Hawkeyes football